Frank A. Kellman was a politician in the U.S. state of Wisconsin.

Biography
Kellman resided in Galesville, Wisconsin. His son, Norris J. Kellman, would later serve in the Wisconsin State Assembly.

Career
Kellman was born in Hillared, Sweden on April 24, 1869. He worked as a tin smith and then was in the hardware business. He also managed a creamery. Kellman served as mayor of Galesville and then served in the Wisconsin State Assembly from 1931 to 1934 as a Republican. He was a delegate to the 1936 Republican National Convention.

References

People from Galesville, Wisconsin
Businesspeople from Wisconsin
Swedish emigrants to the United States
Mayors of places in Wisconsin
Republican Party members of the Wisconsin State Assembly
1869 births
Year of death missing